In real algebraic geometry, Gudkov's conjecture, also called Gudkov’s congruence, (named after Dmitry Gudkov) was a conjecture, and is now a theorem, which states that an M-curve of even degree  obeys the congruence
  
where  is the number of positive ovals and  the number of negative ovals of the M-curve.

The theorem was proved by the combined works of Vladimir Arnold and Vladimir Rokhlin.

See also
Hilbert's sixteenth problem
Tropical geometry

References

Conjectures that have been proved
Theorems in algebraic geometry
Real algebraic geometry